I Am the Blues is a Canadian documentary film, directed by Daniel Cross and released in 2016. The film explores the culture of blues music, beginning at the Blue Front Cafe in Bentonia, Mississippi and expanding outward to profile many of the oldest blues musicians who are still performing on the traditional African American Chitlin' Circuit.

Musicians appearing in the film include Bobby Rush, Barbara Lynn, Henry Gray, Carol Fran, Little Freddie King, Lazy Lester, Robert "Bilbo" Walker, Jimmy "Duck" Holmes, R. L. Boyce, L. C. Ulmer and Paul "Lil' Buck" Sinegal.

The film premiered at the International Documentary Film Festival Amsterdam in October 2015, and had its Canadian premiere at the Hot Docs Canadian International Documentary Festival in May 2016.

The film won two Canadian Screen Awards at the 5th Canadian Screen Awards in 2017, for Best Feature Length Documentary and Best Cinematography in a Documentary.

References

External links
 

2015 films
2015 documentary films
Canadian documentary films
Documentary films about blues music and musicians
EyeSteelFilm films
Films directed by Daniel Cross
Best Documentary Film Genie and Canadian Screen Award winners
2010s English-language films
2010s Canadian films
English-language documentary films